Offset Software was a video game development company based in Newport Beach, California. It was founded by Sam McGrath, Travis Stringer, Trevor Stringer and Rod Green; except for Green, they had worked for S2 Games developing Savage: The Battle for Newerth, which won the grand prize at the Independent Games Festival in 2004.

The company had one game under development, a first-person shooter with the working title "Project Offset". (Some official preview videos have shown third-person views for close-quarters combat.) The game featured a detailed high fantasy world. It was showcased on Attack of the Show! in 2005.

In February 2008, Intel acquired Offset Software, having purchased the Havok engine in 2007.

Intel canceled the game in mid-2010, citing "recent changes in our product roadmap" (possibly meaning the failure of Larrabee as a consumer product). The founders of Offset Software have moved to a new game development studio named Fractiv LLC.

The Offset Engine was licensed by Red 5 Studios in 2006 to create their MMOFPS game Firefall. Intel shutting down the Offset team did not mean Red 5 could no longer use the engine. The game used a heavily modified engine originally based on the Offset Engine.

References

External links
 
 

Video game development companies
Video game companies established in 2004
Video game companies disestablished in 2010
Intel software
Companies based in Newport Beach, California
Defunct video game companies of the United States
Defunct companies based in Greater Los Angeles